David Nicholl or Nicoll may refer to:

David Nicholl (neurologist), Irish neurologist
David Nicholl (rugby union) (1871–1918), Welsh international rugby union player
David Nicoll (anarchist) (1859–1919), British anarchist
David Nicoll (footballer), Scottish footballer
Dave Nicoll, English motocross racer

See also
David Nicholls (disambiguation)
Dave Nichol (1940–2013), Canadian product marketing expert
David Nichol (Chicago Daily News), worked with his wife, Judy Barden, in occupied Berlin
David Nichols (disambiguation)
David Nicolle (born 1944), British historian
Dave Nicol, American jockey
Dave Nicol, Canadian folk singer
Dave Nicol, hockey player